Baptist Christianity in Sichuan refers to the history and implantation of Baptist Christianity in the Chinese province of Sichuan (formerly romanized as Szechuan or Szechwan; also referred to as "West China").

History 

Baptist Christianity was introduced into Sichuan by the American Baptist Missionary Union (ABMU, belonging to the American Baptist Churches USA). The first missionaries to reach the province were Rev. William M. Upcraft and Rev. George Warner, who sailed in 1889. The journey required many weeks before their arrival in Suifu (also, Suichaufu) the following year, where they established the mission's first station. Medical work was started by Rev. C. H. Finch in 1891, in the same year Rev. Robert Wellwood and his wife joined the mission.

At the end of 1892, the ABMU was represented by nine missionaries, with medical work, two preaching places, women's classes, a boys' school, a Sunday school and eleven converts. In 1893, twelve new workers joined the mission, and subsequently the opening of a new station in Jiading (Kiatingfu) in 1894. At that time, the number of missionaries connected with the West China Mission was twenty-two. A small church had been gathered at Xuzhou (Suifu). The remote character of the province and its need of Christian missionary labors lent a romantic and unusual interest to the work of the West China Mission, especially since that was the nearest approach of American Baptists to reaching the people of an unevangelized country, Tibet.

That same year (1894), Upcraft and H. J. Openshaw traveled to Yazhou (Yachowfu) and tried to rent some permanent quarters. This stirred up opposition and vile placards were posted abusing the foreigners. However, the tide was turned in favor of the missionaries after successfully treating the servant of an official bitten by a snake, they were allowed to stay.

In 1895, a serious outbreak of anti-foreign agitation began in the capital Chengdu (Chengtu), and thence spread throughout the province. The missionaries had no choice but to temporarily leave their posts. Work was resumed after their return in the spring of 1896. By the middle of the year 1900, the Church had 68 converts with some 200 names on the enquirers' roll. The year 1900 was marked by the anti-Christian uprising known as Boxer Rebellion. Although this unrest did not affect Sichuan so much as some other parts of China, missionaries were obliged by consular orders to retire to the coast. During their absence, the local converts defended their faith and carried on all the regular services. Two new stations were opened at Ningyuan and Chengdu in 1905 and 1909 respectively; while Rev. Joseph Taylor and his wife were transferred from Yazhou to Chengdu.

In 1910, the ABMU changed its name to American Baptist Foreign Mission Society (ABFMS), and became one of the four founding societies of the West China Union University, together with American Methodist Episcopal Mission (Methodist Episcopal Church), Canadian Methodist Mission (Methodist Church of Canada), and Friends' Foreign Mission Association (British Quakers).

During the 1911 Revolution which overthrew the Qing dynasty, Openshaw took care of the wounded, with his wife as auxiliary. The local Christians later told of Mrs. Openshaw's bravery during the siege of Yazhou, how she would play the organ and sing while bullets whizzed about the house.

In 1919, the ABFMS celebrated the thirtieth anniversary of its West China Mission. In 1920, Rev. A. G. Adams assumed responsibility for the work of the evangelistic field, which had been for several years under the direction of Rev. David Crockett Graham, a polymath Baptist minister who was ordained at the First Baptist Church of Fairport, New York, in 1911, and spent nearly forty years in Sichuan Province, arriving shortly after his ordination. He was also one of the key figures in the discovery of the archaeological site now known as Sanxingdui, when a collection of jade pieces contributed to the Museum of Art, Archaeology and Ethnology at the West China Union University by an English Anglican missionary, Vyvyan Donnithorne, in 1931, drew his attention, subsequently leading to an archaeological excavation in 1934.

By 1913, the American Baptists had 793 church members; and by the end of 1921, 1,263 members.

In 1924, a Swedish American missionary Esther Nelson was sent to Sichuan by the First Swedish Baptist Church of Minneapolis. Between 1924 and 1945, she worked primarily as a nurse and medical educator in various Baptist hospitals. She applied to become a full-time evangelist after the formation of the Baptist General Conference's Foreign Mission Board in 1945. This led her to the city of Huili in Southern Sichuan at the end of 1947, where she worked until 1950, when foreign missionaries were driven out of China by the newly established communist regime.

In 1938, Alfred James Broomhall, an English Baptist missionary, entered China through the China Inland Mission. In 1946, he entered the territory of the Independent Nuosu in Southern Sichuan, with a team to establish a sustained Christian witness among them. He was only able to live among the Nuosu people from 1947 to 1951, and spent his last few months under house arrest before being expelled from China by communist regime; but his team was able to plant seeds that were going to bear fruit in coming decades.

Current situation 

After the communist takeover of China in 1949, Protestant Churches in China were also forced to sever their ties with respective overseas Churches, which has thus led to the merging of all the denominations into communist-sanctioned Three-Self Patriotic Church.

The Cooperative Baptist Fellowship (CBF) and Hua Mei International (a non-profit Chinese Christian organization) provided critical relief supplies such as food, blankets and other necessities after the 2008 Sichuan earthquake. Two CBF field personnel Bill and Michelle Cayard also helped three pastors at a Protestant church in Bazhong with its growing congregation, which was ill-equipped to meet the needs of an increasing number of converts.

Surveys published in 1913

See also 

 Christianity in Sichuan
 Catholic Church in Sichuan
 Protestantism in Sichuan
 Anglicanism in Sichuan
 Methodism in Sichuan
 Quakerism in Sichuan
 Seventh-day Adventist Church in Sichuan
 Anti-Christian Movement (China)
 Anti-missionary riots in China
 Denunciation Movement
 House church (China)

References

Bibliography 
 
 
 

 
Sichuan
History of Christianity in Sichuan